The 1977 Washington Star International was a men's tennis tournament and was played on outdoor clay courts in Washington, D.C., USA. It was part of the 1977 Grand Prix circuit and categorized as a 4 star event. It was the 9th edition of the tournament and was held in Washington, D.C. from July 18 through July 25, 1977. First-seeded Guillermo Vilas won the singles title, his second after 1975, and earned the $20,000 first-prize money. The singles final was delayed for two hours due to rain.

Finals

Singles
 Guillermo Vilas defeated  Brian Gottfried 6–4, 7–5
 It was Vilas' 6th singles title of the year and the 25th of his career.

Doubles
 John Alexander /  Phil Dent defeated  Fred McNair /  Sherwood Stewart 7–5, 7–5

References

External links
 ATP tournament profile
 ITF tournament edition details

Washington Open (tennis)
Washington Star International
Washington Star International
Washington Star International